Gnu High is an LP by Canadian trumpeter Kenny Wheeler featuring Keith Jarrett, Dave Holland and Jack DeJohnette recorded in 1975 and released on the ECM label in 1976.

Reception
The Allmusic review by Michael G. Nastos calls the album "an auspicious starting point, albeit long winded, for a magical performer whose sound and smarts captured the imagination of so many fellow musicians and listeners from this point onward".

Track listing
All compositions by Kenny Wheeler.

 "Heyoke" – 21:56  
 "Smatter" – 6:01
 "Gnu Suite" – 12:49

Personnel
Kenny Wheeler - flugelhorn
Keith Jarrett - piano
Dave Holland - bass
Jack DeJohnette - drums

References

1975 EPs
Kenny Wheeler albums
ECM Records albums
Albums produced by Manfred Eicher